Omiodes scotaea is a moth of the family Crambidae. It is endemic to the Hawaiian islands of Oahu, Molokai and Hawaii.

The larvae feed on Astelia veratroides. They feed between the leaves of the crown of their host plant. They eat the surface and substance of the leaf, leaving the opposite epidermis, which shows as dead portions of the leaves. In some small plants, they bore down into the stem from where they had been feeding between the leaves in the middle of the crown of the plant. Full-grown larvae are about 27 mm long and bright green if they have been feeding on the greener leaves and paler if they have fed in the inner part of the crown where there is very little chlorophyll in the leaves.

The pupa is 12 mm long and uniform pale brown. The pupal period lasts 11–12 days.

External links

Moths described in 1912
Endemic moths of Hawaii
scotaea